Nikki Boyer (born July 22, 1975) is an American actress and singer-songwriter. Boyer is the former host of Yahoo!'s "Daytime in No Time," receiving millions of hits per day.  Boyer is also the former co-host of Watch This! on the TV Guide Channel.

Career 
Nikki moved to Los Angeles, California in 1998 and began singing with The Spirit Theory.

In 2003 and 2004, Boyer hosted TLC's reality television series Perfect Proposal. In 2007, she became the co-host of Watch This! on the TV Guide Channel.

In 2008, her latest album, Underlying Poetry was released with her band The Spirit Theory.  She now performs with "The Cardboard Cutouts":her band with Tommy Fields.  Boyer also regularly appears on The Tonight Show's Ross "The Intern" Mathews' podcast "Straight Talk with Ross".

Until recently, Nikki hosted Yahoo TV's Daytime in No Time, a spin-off of Primetime in No Time. For a short time, she also co-hosted Yahoo TV's What's so funny? with Mike Bachman.

Nikki is the host and co creator of the hit Wondery Podcast, "Dying for Sex." Listed as one of the top 20 Pods on Apple Podcasts, Nikki helps her best friend Molly tell her story.  When Molly is diagnosed with Stage IV breast cancer, she decides to do something bold. She leaves an unhappy marriage and embarks on a series of sexual adventures to feel alive.

Filmography 

1999: A Vow to Cherish (TV movie); as Cindy
2000: GamePro Minutes (TV series); as the Hostess
2002: The Jersey; 3 episodes
2004: Perfect Proposal (TV series); as the Hostess
2005: The Dry Spell; as the College Girl
2005: The Late Late Show with Craig Ferguson; episode: #1.107 (sketch comedy actor)
2006: Midnight Clear; as Megan
2006: So NoTORIous; episode: "Street" (scary voice)
2006: Malcolm In The Middle; episode: "Morp"
2006: Watch This! (TV series); co-host
2007: According To Jim (TV series); episode: "The Flannelsexual" as Tanya Mountains
2007: The L Word (TV series); episode: "Livin' La Vida Loca" as Student #2
2007: Cake: A Wedding Story; as the Nurse
2009: Coyote County Loser; as Lauren Hartford
2012: Slap Therapy (movie short) 
2012: All the Wrong Notes (TV series; also producer)
2012–13: Sketchy (TV series; also producer and writer)

 Discography – with The Spirit Theory 
2000: Hoping To Make Sense2003: The Calmness in the Riot2008: Underlying Poetry''

References

External links 

 Boyer's former website

1975 births
Actresses from Los Angeles
Actresses from St. Louis
American women singer-songwriters
American television actresses
Living people
Singer-songwriters from California
Webster University alumni
21st-century American singers
21st-century American actresses